The Mullewa was an overnight passenger train operated by the Western Australian Government Railways between Perth and Mullewa in the Mid West Region via the Eastern and Northern lines.

History
The Mullewa commenced operating on 30 October 1961 as a three times a week service between Perth and Mullewa.

In the 1940s a two days a week passenger service was available.
Previously sleeper carriages had been attached to a freight train. At Mullewa it connected with a road coach service to Geraldton. Once a week, a sleeping carriage continued beyond Mullewa to Meekatharra attached to a freight train. The Mullewa was withdrawn on 17 March 1974.

References

Mullewa, Western Australia
Named passenger trains of Western Australia
Night trains of Australia
Railway services discontinued in 1974
1974 disestablishments in Australia
1961 establishments in Australia
Railway services introduced in 1961
Discontinued railway services in Australia